Abboud, Aboud, or `Ābūd is an Arabic nickname to any Arabic name that starts with Abdul Abdel Abdal (e.g. Abdallah, Abdelrahman). Instances include:

Given name
 Aboud El Khodary (born 1947), Egyptian footballer
 Aboud El Zomor (born 1948), Egyptian general
 Aboud Jumbe (1920 – 2016), Zanzibari politician
 Aboud Omar (born 1992), Kenyan footballer
 Abboud Qanbar (born 1945), Iraqi General
 Aboud Rogo (1968 – 2012), Kenyan Muslim cleric
 Aboud Yasin aka Abdul Rahman Yasin (born 1960), Iraqi-American suspect in the 1993 World Trade Center bombing 
Surname
 Ahmed Aboud (born 1970), Iraqi Olympic boxer
 Alan Aboud (born 1966), Irish graphic designer
 Aline Abboud (born 1988), German journalist
 Dick Aboud (1941–2000), Canadian football player
 Élie Aboud (born 1959), French-Lebanese politician and doctor
 Fadi Abboud (born 1955), Lebanese businessman and politician 
 Farid Abboud (born 1951), Lebanese diplomat
 Fathi Aboud (born 1964), Libyan triple jumper
 Ghassan Aboud (born 1967), Syrian entrepreneur and philanthropist
 Hassan Aboud (died 2014), Syrian opposition leader 
 Ibrahim Abboud (1900–1983), Sudanese president
 Ibrahim Aboud (born 1987), arrested in the 2006 Toronto terrorism case 
 James Aboud (born 1956), Trinidad and Tobago High Court judge and poet
 John Aboud (born 1973), American writer and comedian
 Joseph Abboud (born 1950), American fashion designer and author
 Jumana Emil Abboud (born 1971), Palestinian artist
 Kamel Abboud (born 1961), Algerian boxer
 Layal Abboud (born 1982) Lebanese singer
 Mahmoud Mohamed Aboud (born 1960), Comorian diplomat
 Mario Abboud (born 1981), Lebanese basketball center
 Mark Abboud (born 1970) American soccer player
 Maroun Abboud (1886–1962), Lebanese poet
 Michel Abboud (born 1977), Lebanese-born architect and artist 
 Nour Abboud (born 1996), Lebanese-born legal counsel and activist 
 Patrick Bou Abboud (born 1987), Lebanese basketball player
 Paula Aboud (born 1950), U.S. politician, Arizona Senate member
 Rabah Aboud (born 1981), Algerian runner
 Sadoon Abboud (born 1967), Iraqi boxer
 Samir Aboud (born 1972), Libyan football goalkeeper
 Sari Abboud aka Massari (born 1980), Lebanese Canadian R&B/pop singer
 Shafic Abboud (1926–2004), Lebanese painter
 Shawqi Aboud (1927-2008), Iraqi coach

Al-Aboud surname
 Abdulrahman Al-Aboud (born 1995), Saudi Arabian footballer
 Fadel Al-Aboud (1872–1936), head of the Haj Fadel government in eastern Syria
 Khaled Al-Aboud (born 1990), Saudi Arabian footballer 

Middle name
 Abdelwahid Aboud Mackaye (born 1953), Chadian insurgent leader 
 Salah Aboud Mahmoud (born 1950), Iraqi Army general

Placename
 Abud, Oman
 Abboud, Palestine
 Abu Abud,  Nasar Rural District, Arvandkenar District, Abadan County, Khuzestan Province, Iran
 Ras Abu Aboud, district in Doha, Qatar
 Sheykh Abud, Kushk-e Hezar Rural District, Beyza District, Sepidan County, Fars Province, Iran

See also
 Abd (Arabic)
 Abud (disambiguation)
 Al-Abud Network, insurgent group in the Iraq War

Arabic-language surnames